Benjamin Bonzi and Quentin Halys were the defending champions, but were not eligible to compete this year.

Álvaro López San Martín and Jaume Munar won the title, defeating William Blumberg and Tommy Paul in the final, 6–4, 6–2.

Seeds

Draw

Finals

Top half

Bottom half

External links 
 Draw

Boys' Doubles
2015